Wasim Bari (born 23 March 1948) is a former Pakistani international cricketer who played in 81 Test matches and 51 One Day Internationals from 1967 to 1984. Bari was a wicket-keeper and right-handed batsman. At the end of his 17-year career he was the most capped player in Pakistani Test history.

His talent was first recognised in 1967 with members of the England under 25 team stating that he was the best keeper to come out of the South Asia. It was in England where he made his Test match debut, with Colin Milburn being his first dismissal. With the bat he managed 15.88 per innings in his career, including an innings of 60 not out at number 11, in which he helped score a last wicket partnership of 133 with Wasim Raja.

According to Tony Greig, commentator and former England captain, most people believe Alan Knott was the best wicket-keeper to have played the game in that era but Knott himself believed Bari was better than him. Imran Khan, who persuaded Wasim Bari from retiring earlier, believed he was as good as Knott.

In 1971 at Leeds, he equalled the then world record of 8 catches in a Test match. He was in the record books again in 1976/77 by stumping 4 batsmen in a Test, against the Australians. In 1979 against New Zealand he caught 7 of the first 8 batsmen, creating a world record for most dismissals in a Test innings. He finished his career with 228 Test victims, the most by a Pakistani and the most by a South Asian keeper at the time. Among South Asians, only M S Dhoni has more catches and stumpings in Test cricket.

Wasim Bari captained Pakistan in 6 Test matches and five one-day internationals, all of them against England home and away, at a time when Pakistan was deprived of some its best and most recognisable players, such as Imran Khan, Zaheer Abbas, Majid Khan and Mushtaq Mohammed, by Kerry Packer's World Series Cricket. He was caught up in the middle of a controversy during the tour to England regarding the growing practice of short-pitched bowling at tailend batsman after Iqbal Qasim was forced to retire hurt after being hit by Bob Willis in the first Test at Birmingham.

Education
He was educated at the Cantonment Public School, Karachi.

References

 

1948 births
Living people
Karachi cricketers
Pakistan International Airlines cricketers
Pakistan One Day International cricketers
Pakistan Test cricketers
Pakistan Test cricket captains
Pakistani cricket captains
Sindh cricketers
St. Patrick's College (Karachi) alumni
Cricketers at the 1975 Cricket World Cup
Cricketers at the 1979 Cricket World Cup
Cricketers at the 1983 Cricket World Cup
Pakistani cricketers
Cricketers from Karachi
Karachi Blues cricketers
Pakistan International Airlines A cricketers
South Zone (Pakistan) cricketers
St. Patrick's High School, Karachi alumni
Wicket-keepers